Sir Matthew James Nicklin FRSA (born 1970) is a British High Court judge. 

Nicklin was born in Oxford, England and was educated at Tasker Milward Voluntary Controlled School in Haverfordwest and completed a first-class LLB at Newcastle University in 1992.

Nicklin was called to the bar at Lincoln's Inn in 1993 and practised from 1996, specialising in privacy and defamation law. In addition to practice, he wrote The Law of Privacy and the Media in 2002 which was taken into a third edition.

He served as a recorder from 2009 to 2017 and took silk in 2013. He was joint-head of chambers at 5RB from 2014 to 2017. He was a member of the Bar Standards Board from 2007 to 2013. In 2010, he was elected a Fellow of the Royal Society of Arts. He is on Newcastle Law School's Advisory Board.

On 2 October 2017, Nicklin was appointed a judge of the High Court and assigned to the Queen's Bench Division. He took the customary knighthood in the same year. Since February 2021, he has been Judge in Charge of the Media and Communications List.

References

Living people
1970 births
21st-century English judges
Knights Bachelor
Alumni of Newcastle University
Members of Lincoln's Inn
Queen's Bench Division judges
English King's Counsel
21st-century King's Counsel